Howard Wilson "Soup" Cable (April 4, 1913 – February 19, 1995) was an American professional basketball player. He bypassed college basketball after graduating from high school and jumped right to the professional ranks, first with the Akron Firestone Non-Skids (1937–1941) and then to the Toledo Jim White Chevrolets (1941–42). Cable led the Non-Skids to consecutive National Basketball League championships in 1938–39 and 1939–40. In both of those seasons he was named to the All-NBL First Team.  He was married to Catherine Tobin and had three children. Catherine's brother was Paul Tobin, a teammate of Cable's with Akron.

References

1913 births
1995 deaths
Akron Firestone Non-Skids players
Amateur Athletic Union men's basketball players
Basketball players from Akron, Ohio
Guards (basketball)
Toledo Jim White Chevrolets players
American men's basketball players